Leptosuchomorpha is a clade of phytosaurs. It is a node-based taxon defined as the last common ancestor of Leptosuchus studeri and Pseudopalatus pristinus and all of its descendants.

Phylogeny
Below is a cladogram from Stocker (2012)

References

Phytosaurs
Late Triassic reptiles of Europe
Late Triassic reptiles of North America
Late Triassic first appearances
Late Triassic extinctions
Taxa named by Michelle R. Stocker